Kitasatospora xanthocidica is a bacterium species from the genus Kitasatospora. Kitasatospora xanthocidica produces xanthocidin, piericidin A, glucopiericidin A and resipinomycins.

See also 
 List of Streptomyces species

References

Further reading

External links
Type strain of Streptomyces xanthocidicus at BacDive – the Bacterial Diversity Metadatabase

Streptomycineae
Bacteria described in 1966